New Hampshire Route 124 (abbreviated NH 124) is a  east–west highway in southern New Hampshire, United States. It runs from Marlborough to the Massachusetts border.

The western terminus of NH 124 is in Marlborough at New Hampshire Route 101. The road continues through Marlborough, a short section of Troy and enters the northwestern part of Jaffrey. The road skirts the southern slopes of Mount Monadnock, across Jaffrey, and into Sharon. In Sharon, there is a New Hampshire historical marker (number 68) on the northern side of the road marking the site of a gate that once collected tolls for the 3rd New Hampshire Turnpike, which followed much of the present-day route of NH 124. The road enters New Ipswich and continues through that town. 

The eastern terminus of NH 124 is at the Massachusetts state line in Mason. The road continues into Massachusetts as Greenville Road in the town of Townsend.

Major intersections

References

External links

 New Hampshire State Route 124 on Flickr

124
Transportation in Cheshire County, New Hampshire
Transportation in Hillsborough County, New Hampshire